Talento de barrio is a film released on October 10, 2008, by Maya Entertainment, starring Daddy Yankee. The film was directed by José Iván Santiago, and written by George Rivera and Ángel M. Sanjurjo, with additional material by Edgar Soberón Torchia. It was also the first movie Daddy Yankee co-produced. In the United States it was a major success, although it was not launched in all the country. It was shown in the major cities like New York City, Los Angeles, and some parts of New Jersey.

In Latin America, it was shown in Puerto Rico and Dominican Republic. The DVD of the movie was released in all the countries of Latin America. Big sales went on in Central America, mostly in El Salvador.

Plot
Ramón Ayala (better known as Daddy Yankee) stars as Edgar Dinero, a young man from the streets of Puerto Rico who gets tangled up in the thug life of his neighborhood. While on that path, Edgar encounters disruption among his crew men, while simultaneously falling in love with an uptown girl, Soribel (played by Katiria Soto), from whom Dinero must conceal his strong ties with the violent neighborhood underworld.

Dinero's first studio recording in New York City doesn't go well. It seems he has no energy and sounds like he hasn't eaten. When his love interest, the uptown girl, shows up in NYC, he begins to make strong recordings.

Multiple gunshot scenes happen throughout the movie, in Puerto Rico and in New York City.

Other places where filming took place were at Puerto Nuevo, in San Juan, and in New York City.

Cast
Daddy Yankee - Edgar "Dinero"
Maestro - Jeico
Katiria Soto - Soribel
César Farrait - Wichy
Angélica Alcaide - Natasha
Norma Colón - Edgar's mother
Norman Santiago - Matías
Rafael Acevedo - Matías's partner
Welmo E. Romero-Joseph - Leo
Rey Pirín - Javier
Pepe Fuentes - Don Joaquín
Moncho Conde - Popó
Gringo - Angelo
Eric Rodríguez - Wito
Alexandra Cheron - Carolina
Glory - Tata
Zojaira Martínez - Ana
Julio Voltio - Himself
Eddie Dee - Jay
Friend Zone Guy - Gazoo Star "El Jamón"
Pedro Prez
Christian Santiago - edger
Federico Cardona (DjSolid) - Gatillero Oscar 2
José López - Juan de Dios

Promotion

Soundtrack

A soundtrack was released, featuring music by Daddy Yankee written only for the film. The soundtrack, however, does not include the film score, composed by Sam FISH Fisher. The soundtrack features four singles "Pose", "Somos de Calle", "¿Qué Tengo Que Hacer?", and "Llamado de Emergencia". The music derives from Daddy Yankee's typical reggaeton style.

Home video
Talento de barrio was released in the United States, Canada and Puerto Rico on November 25, 2008 on DVD and Blu-ray Disc formats. The film is featured in Spanish and is subtitled in English on both the DVD and Blu-ray Disc versions.

Reception
The film had positive reviews in Puerto Rico. On Rotten Tomatoes, Talento de barrio has received negative reviews, garnering 0% approval. V.A. Musetto of New York Post said in his review for the film: "Reggaeton star Daddy Yankee holds his own in his big-screen acting debut, Talento de barrio. Too bad he's saddled with a generic script, based loosely on his own life". Monika Fabian of Time Out New York said: "Just as reggaetón is a fusion of hip-hop, reggae and traditional Puerto Rican rhythms, Talento de barrio is also a mixture, albeit a woefully derivative one, of 8 Mile, Menace II Society and Carlito's Way."

See also

 2008 in film
 Crime in Puerto Rico
 List of hood films

References

External links
 
 
 Maya Entertainment - Talento de barrio - Press Kit - (English/Spanish) (PDF format)
 Talento de barrio on CorrienteLatina

2008 films
2008 drama films
2000s Spanish-language films
Puerto Rican films
Hood films
2000s American films